Country Party is a song written by Rick Nelson and recorded by American country music artist Johnny Lee. It was released in May 1977 as the third single from the album, H-e-e-ere's Johnny!. It is a slight re-write of Rick Nelson's song, Garden Party. The song reached number 15 on the Billboard Hot Country Singles & Tracks chart and number 50 on the Canadian RPM Country Tracks chart.

Chart performance

References

1977 singles
1977 songs
Johnny Lee (singer) songs